The Walther automatic shotgun is a German self-loading shotgun that was produced by Walther.

History
The shotgun uses designs by Fritz Walther and Georg Walther patented in 1918. Original production was handled by Deutsche Werke in the early 1920s, but was later improved by Walther, with refinements being made to the original design such as the addition of new parts like dust covers and reinforcement ribs. Production is thought to have ended in the 1930s.

Design
The Walther automatic shotgun was a short recoil, toggle-action design, with the whole rear receiver recoiling back on firing. A toggle joint is seen inside the weapon connected to the bolt. A switch on the left side of the weapon can be toggled to drop the handguard which acts as the magazine tube; the magazine tube holds four shells. A bolt release button can be found on the underside of the receiver just behind the handguard.

Semi-automatic shotguns